Bruton Railway Cutting is a 1.7 hectare geological Site of Special Scientific Interest at Bruton in Somerset, notified in 1971. 

The geology exposed in the area near Bruton station (which opened in 1856 on what is now the Heart of Wessex Line) is from the Bathonian epoch of the Middle Jurassic. The citation for the site describes it as one of the best places in England to demonstrate the stratigraphic distinction of ammonites in the subcontractus zone and the morrisi zone.

See also
 Wookey Station
 Godminster Lane Quarry and Railway Cutting

References

External links
 English Nature website (SSSI information)

Sites of Special Scientific Interest in Somerset
Sites of Special Scientific Interest notified in 1971
Railway cuttings in the United Kingdom
Rail transport in Somerset
Geology of Somerset
Bruton